"Traffic Light" (Korean: 신호등; RR: Sinhodeung) is a song by Korean singer and songwriter Lee Mu-jin. It was released on May 14, 2021, as Lee's first single after his third-place finish on Korean music audition show Sing Again in 2020.

Background 
In November 2020, Lee was entered into the popular South Korean music audition show Sing Again. The shows aim is to take nameless singers and open them up to public interest, which means every contestant is referred to by a number instead of their name, which left Lee anonymous throughout the show's duration. Lee progressed through each round and was one of six people to compete in the finals on February 8, 2021, where he finished in third place. His performance of "Is Anybody There?" has currently amassed over 30 million views on YouTube, showcasing his popularity. After finishing third, he began working on "Traffic Light," and released the song three months after the show's conclusion. The songs concept is a reference to a line he said during his initial performance on the show, where he stated he was "a yellow light type of singer."

Lyrics 

Lee's self-written lyrics to "Traffic Light" compare the anxiety people feel in their early-twenties to the feelings of a learning driver. In the chorus, he sings "red and green, in between are 3 short seconds," referring to the amber light often found on traffic lights. Lee compares moments of anxiety while growing up to yellow lights found on roads. He describes the amber light by saying "it makes me hollow, I don't even know if I'm going fast or slow, it's just all yellow in front of me" comparing the light to the anxiety in life that confuses his mind in between moments of relaxation and excitement.

Music video 
The music video for "Traffic Light" was published 14 May 2021, and shows Lee meeting his friends in a forest cabin for his birthday. The video begins with Lee using a map to search for the house, before he sees his friends driving in the distance. He hops in their car, and they make their way to a nearby lake where Lee plays his friends' music while they drink coffee by a campfire. They then make their way to the cabin, and are shown having fun in its garden with water balloons, a trampoline and water pistols. The music videos ends with Lee's birthday party, and quick flashbacks to previous points in his day.

Credits and personnel 
 Lee Mu-jin – vocals, composition, lyrics, arrangement
 Yoo Jong-ho – arrangement, keyboard, guitar bass, drum, recording directing
 Lee Tae-wook – guitar
 Lee Seo-yeon – piano
 B'Sound – brass
 Kim Kwang-min - recording
 MasterKey – mixing
 Kwon Nam-woo – mastering

Charts

Weekly charts

Monthly charts

Year-end charts

Accolades

Certifications

References 

2021 debut singles
2021 songs
Korean-language songs
South Korean folk songs
South Korean pop songs
Songs about anxiety
Gaon Digital Chart number-one singles
Billboard Korea K-Pop number-one singles